HD 72659 b is a superjovian exoplanet massing at least 3.3 MJ orbiting at 4.77 AU from the star taking 3630 days to orbit. The orbital distance range from 3.49 AU to 6.05 AU with orbital eccentricity of 0.269. In 2022, the inclination and true mass of HD 72659 b were measured via astrometry.

See also 
 HD 73256

References

External links 
 

Exoplanets discovered in 2002
Giant planets
Hydra (constellation)
Exoplanets detected by radial velocity
Exoplanets detected by astrometry